Xələc (also, Xələnc, Khaladzh, and Khalandzh) is a village and municipality in the Khizi Rayon of Azerbaijan.  It has a population of 322.

References 

Populated places in Khizi District